Richmond City Hall Observation Deck is the observation deck on the 18th floor of the Richmond, Virginia City Hall. It's free to the public. Access is through the elevators on the main floor, however access is currently prohibited to the public.

References

Buildings and structures in Richmond, Virginia
Tourist attractions in Richmond, Virginia
Observation decks
Scenic viewpoints in the United States